This is a list of Unitarian bishops. Traditionally  Unitarians of Magyar origins since their inception with Bishop Ferenc Dávid maintain an episcopal polity.

Bishoprics
 Bishopric of Cluj
 Bishopric of Budapest
 Unitarian bishopric of Scandinavia

Bishops

 Ferenc Dávid 1568–1579
 Demeter Hunyadi 1579–1592
 Enyedi György 1592–1597
 Kósa János 1597–1601
 Máté Toroczkai 1601–1616
 Radeczki Bálint 1616–1632
 Csanádi Pál 1632–1636
 Beke Dániel 1636–1661
 Járai János 1661. április 7.–június 3. 
 Két évig a püspöki tisztség betöltetlen maradt, mivel a háború miatt püspökválasztó zsinatot nem lehetett tartani.
 Koncz Boldizsár 1663–1684
 Szentiványi Márkos Dániel 1684-1689
 Bedő Pál 1689–1690
 Nagy Mihály 1691–1692
 Almási Gergely Mihály 1692–1724
 Pálfi Zsigmond 1724–1737
 Mihály Lombard de Szentábrahám 1737–1758
 István Agh 1758–1786
 Lázár István 1786–1811
 Körmöczi János 1812–1836
 Székely Miklós 1838–1843
 Aranyosrákosi Székely Sándor 1845–1852
 Kilenc évig a püspöki tisztség betöltetlen maradt, mivel a kormány nem ismerte el az egyház püspökválasztói jogát. Ezen idő alatt a püspöki teendőket Székely Mózes egyházi főjegyző látta el.
 Kriza János 1861–1875
 Ferencz József 1876–1928
 Boros György 1928–1938
 Varga Béla 1938–1941
 Józan Miklós 1941–1946
 Kiss Elek 1946–1971
 Kovács Lajos 1972–1994
 Erdő János 1994–1996
 Szabó Árpád 1996–2009
 Bálint Benczédi Ferenc 2009–
 Emilsen Ragnar

References 

Unitarian